Amir-Bahman Bagheri was an Iranian military officer. Having previously served as the deputy commander of air defense unit in early 1979, he commanded the Air Force from August 1979 to July 1980. In 1980, he was briefly arrested and removed from the office. Bagheri was arrested again in February 1981 on charges of "complicity" with the Americans in the Operation Eagle Claw. In July 1985, he was sentenced to life imprisonment.

References

Commanders of Islamic Republic of Iran Air Force